Pedro Xavier da Silva de Sousa (born 7 July 1990), commonly known as Pedrinho, is a Curaçaoan footballer who plays as a goalkeeper for CVV Willemstad. He formerly played for RKSV Centro Dominguito and UNDEBA. He was born and raised in Curaçao, but holds Portuguese nationality from his parents.

References 

 
 ffk.cw 2016
 ffk.cw 2017

External links 
 

1990 births
Living people
People from Willemstad
Curaçao footballers
Dutch footballers
Curaçao people of Portuguese descent
Dutch people of Portuguese descent
Association football forwards
C.V.V. Inter Willemstad players
RKSV Centro Dominguito players
RKSV Scherpenheuvel players